Monique Bosga (born 21 September 1960) is a retired swimmer from the Netherlands. She competed at the 1980 Summer Olympics in the 100 m and 200 m backstroke and finished seventh in the former event.

References

1960 births
Living people
Dutch female backstroke swimmers
Olympic swimmers of the Netherlands
Swimmers at the 1980 Summer Olympics
Sportspeople from Maracaibo
20th-century Dutch women